Nordagutu is a village in the municipality of Midt-Telemark, Norway. Its population (SSB 2005) is 367.

Nordagutu train station is a part of the Bratsberg Line, and it serves as a junction between the Vestfold Line and Sørlandet Line.

Villages in Vestfold og Telemark